The Moon Under Water is a pub in Manchester city centre, in the building of the former Deansgate Picture House cinema (an ABC cinema) on Deansgate; it is one of the largest public houses in the United Kingdom.

It is owned by the pub chain JD Wetherspoon who opened it as a public house on 15 August 1995, and is named after George Orwell's essay, "The Moon Under Water", describing his ideal pub ; it is one of several Wetherspoon pubs with the same name.

References

External links 
 

Pubs in Manchester
Former cinemas in Manchester